Anxylotoles caudatus is a species of beetle in the family Cerambycidae, and the only species in the genus Anxylotoles. It was described by Fisher in 1935.

References

Apomecynini
Beetles described in 1935